The 2003–04 Algerian Cup was the 40th edition of the Algerian Cup. USM Alger won the Cup by defeating JS Kabylie 5-4 on penalties in the final after the game ended 0-0. It was USM Alger's seventh Algerian Cup in its history and second in a row.

Round of 32

Round of 16

Quarter-finals

Matches

Semi-finals

Matches

Final

Champions

External links
 Coupe d'Algérie 2004
 2003/04 Coupe Nationale

Algerian Cup
Algerian Cup
Algerian Cup